The IAR K14 was a Romanian 14-cylinder radial aircraft engine.  The IAR K14 was a licensed derivative of the French Gnome-Rhône 14K Mistral Major  produced in Romania.

Variants
IAR K14-I 40
IAR K14-I C32 693 kW (930 hp) engine. 44 for IAR P.24E
IAR K14-II C32 649 kW (870 hp) engine. 50 built  for IAR 37, 1 built for IAR 80 prototype
IAR K14-II D32
IAR K14-III C36690 kW (930 hp) engine. 20 built for IAR 80, 95 built for IAR 37
IAR K14-IV C32 716 kW (960 hp) engine. 30 built for IAR 80, 160 built for IAR 39, 2 built for IAR 47 prototypes
IAR K14-IV C32 1000A 764 kW (1025 hp) engine. 430 built for IAR 80A,IAR 80B,IAR 80C, IAR 81A,IAR 81B,IAR 81C

Applications
Industria Aeronautică Română IAR P.24E
Industria Aeronautică Română IAR 37
Industria Aeronautică Română IAR 39
Industria Aeronautică Română IAR 47
Industria Aeronautică Română IAR 80
Industria Aeronautică Română IAR 81
Savoia-Marchetti SM 79B Romanian type

Specifications

See also

References

Notes

Bibliography

 Gunston, Bill. World Encyclopedia of Aero Engines. Cambridge, England. Patrick Stephens Limited, 1989. 

1930s aircraft piston engines
Aircraft air-cooled radial piston engines